Sir George Handley Knibbs  (13 June 1858 – 30 March 1929) was an Australian scientist, the first Commonwealth Statistician and the first director of the Commonwealth Institute of Science and Industry, predecessor to the CSIRO. He was nicknamed "the Knibb".

Early life
Knibbs was born in Frederick Place, Sydney, son of John Handley Knibbs, foreman, and his wife Ellen née Curthoys.

Career
Knibbs joined the New South Wales Land Survey Department in 1877 and in January 1878 was appointed a licensed surveyor. In 1889 Knibbs resigned to take up private practice as a surveyor, and in 1890 became lecturer in surveying at the University of Sydney. Knibbs was elected a member of the Royal Society of New South Wales in 1881, became a member of the council in 1894, from 1896 to 1906 was almost continuously honorary secretary, and in 1898-9 was president. Knibbs was also taking an active interest in other societies, and was president of the Institution of Surveyors at Sydney for four years in the period between 1892 and 1901, and president of the New South Wales branch and a member of the British Astronomical Association in 1897–8.

Knibbs had begun contributing papers to the Royal Society of New South Wales at an early age, at first on matters arising out of surveying, and then on problems of physics. In his presidential address delivered on 3 May 1899 Knibbs showed that he had spent time studying mathematics. In 1902 and 1903, as a royal commissioner on education, Knibbs travelled through Europe and furnished a valuable report, which led to his being appointed Director of Technical Education for New South Wales in 1905. He was also in this year acting professor of physics at the University of Sydney.

First statistician
In 1906 the Commonwealth Bureau of Census and Statistics was created and Knibbs became its first director. He was the first Statistician for the commonwealth census in 1911.

During World War I Knibbs was on the Royal Commission dealing with problems of trade and industry, and was a consulting member of the committee on munitions of war. In 1920 Knibbs played a leading role at the British Empire Statistical Conference in London. In March 1921 he was made director of the newly founded Institute of Science and Industry, a forerunner to the Commonwealth Scientific and Industrial Research Organisation (CSIRO). At the 1921 meeting of the Australasian Association for the Advancement of Science Knibbs was president of the Social and Statistical Science Section, and took as the subject of his address "Statistics in regard to World and Empire development". Two years later he was president of the association and spoke on "Science and its service to man". Knibbs resigned his directorship of the Institute of Science and Industry in 1926, and lived in retirement until his death of coronary vascular disease at Camberwell, Victoria, a suburb of Melbourne, on 30 March 1929.

Recognition
Knibbs was created a Companion of the Order of St Michael and St George (CMG) in 1911 and was knighted in 1923.

Publications
He contributed 29 papers to the Royal Society of New South Wales, and several of his monographs, largely on statistical subjects (The Mathematical Theory of Population, The Census of Wealth), were published as pamphlets; also monographs on pure mathematics, geodesy, and geodetical instruments. In 1913 he published a volume of verse, Voices of the North and Echoes of Hellas, largely translations, carefully written but not important as poetry, and in 1928 appeared a work on population, The Shadow of the World's Future. He also published Design of the Federal Capital

See also
 Australian Statistician
 1911 Australian census

References

1858 births
1929 deaths
Scientists from Sydney
Australian physicists
Australian public servants
Australian statisticians
Australian Companions of the Order of St Michael and St George
Australian Knights Bachelor